Sir Eric Jackson Thomas FMedSci (born 24 March 1953 in Hartlepool, County Durham) is an English academic who was Vice-Chancellor of the University of Bristol from 2001 to 2015. From 2003 to 2007, he was chair of the Worldwide Universities Network and was the President of Universities UK from 2011 to 2013.

Education and career

Thomas graduated in Medicine from the Newcastle in 1976. He trained as an obstetrician and gynaecologist and worked at both the universities of Sheffield and Newcastle. He obtained an MD-by-thesis in 1987 via his research into endometriosis.

In 1991, he was appointed Professor of Obstetrics and Gynaecology at the University of Southampton, becoming Head of the School of Medicine in 1995 and Dean of the Faculty of Medicine, Health and Biological Sciences in 1998. He was a consultant gynaecologist from 1987 to 2001.

In August 2011, Thomas became President of Universities UK, having previously been its Vice-President, Chair of its England and Northern Ireland Council and Chair of its Research Policy Committee.  He was chair of the Board of CASE Europe, a Member of the Board of CASE and was a Commissioner of the Marshall Aid Commemoration Commission.  He chaired the government Taskforce into Increasing Voluntary Giving in Higher Education, which reported in 2004. He was chair of the Worldwide Universities Network from 2003 – 2007. He was a member of the Board of the South-West Regional Development Agency from 2002–8.

Personal life
Thomas is married and has two children. His interests include golf and Newcastle United Football Club. He was a Deputy Lieutenant of the City and County of Bristol, and was knighted in the 2013 Birthday Honours for services to higher education.

References

External links
The Vice Chancellor's page on the website for Bristol University
Speeches made by Eric Thomas
Curriculum Vitae

1953 births
Vice-Chancellors of the University of Bristol
Academics of the University of Bristol
Academics of the University of Sheffield
Academics of the University of Southampton
Alumni of Newcastle University
Fellows of the Academy of Medical Sciences (United Kingdom)
Knights Bachelor
English gynaecologists
English obstetricians
Living people
People from Hartlepool